Poul Ohff (23 March 1920 – 2010) was a Danish sailor. He competed in the 5.5 Metre event at the 1952 Summer Olympics.

References

External links
 

1920 births
2010 deaths
Danish male sailors (sport)
Olympic sailors of Denmark
Sailors at the 1952 Summer Olympics – 5.5 Metre
People from Horsens
Sportspeople from the Central Denmark Region